The Giurgiu railway station is a train station in the town of Giurgiu, Romania. The station was opened in 1869 as part of the Bucharest-Giurgiu railway. Today, the station is only served by commuter (personal) trains to Bucharest, Grădiștea and Videle. The Giurgiu North railway station is located about one kilometer north of the station and is serviced by the Bosphorus Express operating between Bucharest and Istanbul.

Services

References

Railway stations in Romania
Railway stations opened in 1869
Giurgiu
1869 establishments in Romania
Buildings and structures in Giurgiu County
19th-century architecture in Romania